Akiyasu Motohashi is a former Grand Prix motorcycle road racer from Japan. Motohashi began his Grand Prix career in 1964 with Yamaha. He enjoyed his best season in 1966 when he finished the season in eighth place in the 125cc world championship.

References 

Japanese motorcycle racers
125cc World Championship riders
250cc World Championship riders
Living people
Year of birth missing (living people)